North Carolina Highway 37 (NC 37) is a primary state highway in the northeastern part of the U.S. state of North Carolina.  Traveling north–south, it serves as a connector route from U.S. Route 64 (US 64) to Hertford and from US 13 to Gatesville.

Route description

NC 37 is a predominantly two-lane rural highway which travels  from US 64 near Beasley to US 13 near Gates.  Beginning at exit 548, along US 64, NC 37 travels northeasterly for  before running concurrent with NC 32 and NC 94 near Pea Ridge. Crossing over the Albemarle Sound and entering Chowan County from Washington County, NC 94 splits off towards the Northeastern Regional Airport, followed by NC 32 which heads directly towards Edenton.  Entering Perquimans County, it merges with US 17 for a  concurrency.  Connecting with the city of Hertford, it switches concurrences with U.S. Route 17 Business (US 17 Bus.) in Winfall.  After a  concurrency, it travels solo again as it goes through downtown Winfall then northeasterly through Belvidere.  At Gliden, it rejoins NC 32 for a short concurrency, entering Gates County and through Mintonsville, before separating again at Mitchells Fork.  Traveling through the communities of Willow and Vivian, it goes through downtown Gatesville, where it shares a short concurrency with US 158 Bus.  Continuing north, it connects with US 158 at Eleanors Crossroads.  After traveling through the communities of Buckland and Gates, it ends at US 13  from the Virginia state line.

NC 37 shares part of the Edenton-Windsor Loop where it crosses the Albemarle Sound (indicated by a Scenic Byways sign).  The loop, which connects to nearby Edenton and Windsor, showcases historic sites, like the Cupola House and the Rehoboth Methodist Church, and scenic views of the Inner Banks.  NC 37 is also part of the Historic Albemarle Tour, though no actual historic sites or museums are located along its route.

History
NC 37 was established in 1934 as a renumbering of NC 321 from US 17 in Winfall to SR 53 at the Virginia state line.  In 1940, NC 37 was extended south in concurrency with US 17 into Chowan County, where it then replaced a segment of NC 172 to NC 32 in St. Johns.  In 1952, NC 37 was truncated at US 13,  from the Virginia state line.  In March 1987, NC 37 was rerouted onto new bypass route, in concurrency with US 17, east of Hertford.  North of Hertford, it then shares a concurrency with US 17 Bus. before returning on its routing towards Winfall; its old alignment was replaced by US 17 Bus.

In June 2016, NC 37 was extended south from St. Johns, in a concurrency with NC 32 and NC 94, into Washington County near Beasley; it splits onto new primary routing to its southern terminus at US 64's exit 548.

North Carolina Highway 321

North Carolina Highway 321 (NC 321) was an original state highway that traversed from NC 342, in Winfall, northwest to NC 32, in Gilden.  In 1928, NC 321 was extended northwest, on new primary routing, to NC 30, in Gatesville.  In 1932, NC 32 was extended north again, on new primary routing, to the Virginia state line; the following year Virginia extended SR 53 to the state line to connect with NC 321.  In 1934, because of US 321 existing in the state, NC 321 was renumbered to NC 37.

Major intersections

See also
 North Carolina Bicycle Route 4 - concurrent with NC 37 from Walton Crossroads to Gatesville at NC 137

References

External links

 
 NCRoads.com: N.C. 37
 NCRoads.com: N.C. 321

037
Transportation in Washington County, North Carolina
Transportation in Chowan County, North Carolina
Transportation in Perquimans County, North Carolina
Transportation in Gates County, North Carolina
Historic Albemarle Tour